Barsosio is a surname of Kenyan origin. Notable people with the surname include:

Agnes Jeruto Barsosio (born 1983), Kenyan marathon runner
Florence Barsosio (born 1976), Kenyan marathon runner
Sally Barsosio (born 1978), Kenyan long-distance track runner
Stella Barsosio, Kenyan long-distance runner

Kenyan names